Melioliphila is a genus in the Tubeufiaceae family of fungi.

References

External links
Melioliphila at Index Fungorum

Tubeufiaceae